The Golden Crown (German: Die goldene Krone) is a 1920 German silent film directed by Alfred Halm and starring Henny Porten, Paul Hartmann, and Hugo Pahlke.

The film's sets were designed by the art director Ludwig Kainer.

Cast
 Henny Porten as Mariannne 
 Paul Hartmann as Herzog Franz Günther 
 Hugo Pahlke as Kurt von der Greinz 
 Margarete Schön as Prinzessin Elvira 
 Gustav Czimeg as Herr von Zollingen 
 Albert Patry as Stöven 
 Elsa Wagner as Stövens Frau 
 Hermann Thimig as Klaus, Stövens Sohn 
 Hermann Vallentin as Gustav Lindlieb 
 Elise Zachow-Vallentin as Luise Lindliebs Frau 
 Lisel Verdier as Zofe

References

Bibliography
 Alfred Krautz. International directory of cinematographers, set- and costume designers in film, Volume 4. Saur, 1984.

External links

1920 films
Films of the Weimar Republic
Films directed by Alfred Halm
German silent feature films
German black-and-white films
Films based on Austrian novels
Films based on German novels
UFA GmbH films